Hermas Deslauriers (21 October 1879 – 28 May 1941) was a Canadian politician and physician. Delauriers served in the House of Commons of Canada, initially as one of the Laurier Liberals then as a Liberal member.

He was born in Saint-Charles-sur-Richelieu, Quebec and became a physician as a career.

Deslauriers attended seminary in Sainte-Hyacinthe then studied at Université Laval.

He was first elected to Parliament at the St. Mary riding in the 1917 general election under the Laurier Liberals party banner. He was re-elected as a Liberal in 1921, and won successive terms in 1925, 1926, 1930, 1935 and 1940. Deslauriers died on 28 May 1941 before completing his term in the 19th Canadian Parliament.

References

External links
 

1879 births
1941 deaths
Physicians from Quebec
Laurier Liberals
Liberal Party of Canada MPs
Members of the House of Commons of Canada from Quebec
Université Laval alumni